The 1925–26 season was the 26th season of competitive football in Belgium. Beerschot AC won their 4th Division I title, which was also their 3rd consecutive Belgian title. At the end of the season, SC Anderlechtois, CS Verviétois and R Tilleur FC were relegated to the Promotion, while RC de Bruxelles, FC Malinois and CS La Forestoise were promoted.
For season 1926-27, major changes were brought to the league system. Division I was renamed Division d'Honneur (French for Premier Division), Promotion was renamed Division I with one division of 14 teams (instead of 2) and a third level was introduced, named Promotion and played as 3 divisions of 14 teams each. The bottom two teams in Division d'Honneur would be relegated to Division I (with the top two in Division I promoted, while the bottom 3 teams in Division I would be relegated to the Promotion, with the winners of the 3 Promotion divisions would be promoted to Division I.
Also, the Belgian Cup was played for the first time since World War I.

National team

* Belgium score given first

Key
 H = Home match
 A = Away match
 N = On neutral ground
 F = Friendly
 o.g. = own goal

Honours

Final league tables

Division I

Promotion

Promotion A

Promotion B

External links
RSSSF archive - Final tables 1895-2002
Belgian clubs history